PAFA  may refer to:

 Peace Action is Freedom for All, a political party in Zimbabwe
 Pennsylvania Academy of the Fine Arts
 Perak Amateur Football Association, the former acronym of parent association of Perak football team in Malaysia before it turn professional
 Fairbanks International Airport (ICAO location indicator: PAFA), in Fairbanks, Alaska, United States
 Pan African Federation of Accountants, an umbrella body for Accountants in Africa
 Pakistan Air Force Academy Risalpur, Pakistan